This is a list of albums that charted in the top ten on the ARIA Album Charts, an all-genre albums chart, in 2016.

Top-ten albums
An asterisk (*) represents that the album is in the top ten as of the week ending on 18 December 2017.

Key
(#) - 2016 Year-end top 10 album position and rank

Notes
It is a Christmas album
It is a greatest hits album.
It is a soundtrack of a film/TV series/etc.

References

2016 in Australian music
Australia albums top 10
Australian record charts